Ivo Alexie Basay Hatibović (born 13 April 1966) is a Chilean football manager and former player who played as a striker. Apart from being a regular choice for the Chile national football team in the late 1980s and early 1990s (24 caps, six goals), he played club football for Magallanes, Curicó Unido, Everton, Colo Colo, Stade Reims, Necaxa and Boca Juniors. He is of Bosniak descent.

On 12 April 2012 Amid club president Hernan Levy's departure and head coach Basay's dismissal, Colo Colo looks to regain its confidence under interim head coach Luis Pérez.

International career

International goals
Scores and results list Chile's goal tally first.

Managerial statistics

Personal life
During a radio interview with a Buenos Aires sports show, Basay declared his admiration of Chile's former dictator Augusto Pinochet. At the end of the interview Basay was asked rapid fire one phrase questions, he was asked by the host of the Radio Sports Show "De Caño vale doble" of AM 770 Radio in Buenos Aires, what was his impression of Pinochet, Basay answered that Pinochet was necessary at a time in Chilean history.

Basay is of Bosniak descent.

After managed Ñublense in 2015, he decided to stop his activity in football to spend time with his grandson. In 2018, he returned to football after joining Canal del Fútbol (CDF) as a football commentator. In October of the same year, he left that work to manage Palestino.

Honours

Club

As player
Necaxa
Primera División: 1994–95
Copa México: 1994–95
CONCACAF Cup Winners Cup: 1994
Colo-Colo
Primera División de Chile: 1996, 1997–C, 1998
Copa Chile: 1996
Individual 
Mexican Primera División Golden Boot: 1992–93
Mexican Primera División Golden Ball: 1992–93

As manager
Palestino
Copa Chile : 2018

References

External links

1966 births
Living people
Footballers from Santiago
Chilean footballers
Chilean football managers
Chilean expatriate footballers
Chile international footballers
Chilean people of Croatian descent
Chilean people of Bosniak descent
Association football forwards
Curicó Unido footballers
Magallanes footballers
Deportes Magallanes footballers
Everton de Viña del Mar footballers
Stade de Reims players
Club Necaxa footballers
Boca Juniors footballers
Colo-Colo footballers
Primera B de Chile players
Ligue 2 players
Chilean Primera División players
Liga MX players
Argentine Primera División players
Expatriate footballers in France
Expatriate footballers in Mexico
Expatriate footballers in Argentina
Chilean expatriate sportspeople in France
Chilean expatriate sportspeople in Mexico
Chilean expatriate sportspeople in Argentina
1987 Copa América players
1991 Copa América players
1995 Copa América players
Santiago Morning managers
Chile national under-20 football team managers
Unión San Felipe managers
O'Higgins F.C. managers
Colo-Colo managers
Santiago Wanderers managers
Ñublense managers
Club Deportivo Palestino managers
Deportes La Serena managers
Primera B de Chile managers
Chilean Primera División managers
Canal del Fútbol color commentators